Shahryar Rashed (Urdu: شہریار راشد) (1998–1948) was a Pakistani English language poet. He was the son of the Pakistani Urdu poet Noon Meem Rashid.  Rashed attended Aitchison College, Karachi Grammar School, and the United Nations International School in New York.  After attending Drew University, Shahryar returned to Pakistan to complete his master's degree in English from Punjab University.  He joined the Ministry of Foreign Affairs in 1971. His diplomatic postings took him to Europe, West Africa, Tokyo and Bombay.  At the time of his death in 1998, he was ambassador to Uzbekistan.

Shahryar wrote a number of English radio and stage plays including The Immaculate Puptent which was broadcast on the English Service of BBC radio.  He also published two collections of his verse: Hybrid (1991) and Liquid Clocks (1997).

External links
 Collected poems

1948 births
1998 deaths
English-language poets from Pakistan
Pakistani poets
Pakistani dramatists and playwrights
Pakistani radio writers
Ambassadors of Pakistan to Uzbekistan
Aitchison College alumni
Karachi Grammar School alumni
Punjabi people
University of the Punjab alumni
20th-century poets